On the evening of February 3, 2015, a commuter train on Metro-North Railroad's Harlem Line struck a passenger car at a grade crossing near Valhalla, New York, United States, between the Valhalla and Mount Pleasant stations, killing six people and injuring 15 others, seven very seriously. The crash is the deadliest in Metro-North's history, and at the time the deadliest rail accident in the United States since the June 2009 Washington Metro train collision, which killed nine passengers and injured 80.

The crash occurred after traffic on the adjacent Taconic State Parkway had been detoured onto local roads following a car accident that closed the road in one direction. At the grade crossing, a sport utility vehicle (SUV) driven by Ellen Brody of nearby Edgemont was caught between the crossing gates when they descended onto the rear of her car as the train approached from the south. Instead of backing into the space another driver had created for her, she went forward onto the tracks.

Investigators from the National Transportation Safety Board (NTSB) focused on two issues in the accident: how the passengers were killed, since that rarely occurs in grade crossing collisions; and why Brody went forward into the train's path. After an unusually long delay for such investigations that it declined to explain, the board's 2017 final report found the driver of the SUV to be the cause of the accident. It found no defects with the vehicle, the crossing signage and associated traffic signal preemption, or the train engineer's performance. It found that the failure of the third rail to break into smaller segments contributed to the fatalities on the train; while the report ruled out proposed explanations for Brody's behavior such as the placement of her car's gear shift lever, it could not offer any of its own. Despite the report's findings, lawsuits against the town of Mount Pleasant, which maintains the road along which the grade crossing is located, Westchester County, the railroad and the engineer are proceeding.

Background

At about 5:30 p.m. on February 3, 2015, 14 minutes after sunset, a vehicle traveling south along the Taconic State Parkway north of the hamlet of Valhalla in the town of Mount Pleasant, in central Westchester County north of New York City, struck another vehicle making a turn onto Lakeview Avenue from the northbound parkway. Responding emergency services closed both lanes of the southbound Taconic and one northbound lane. Drivers heading in both directions left the parkway, seeking alternate routes back to it on local surface roads.

It was an express train of eight cars, formed by four Bombardier M7A electric multiple units, bound for the Southeast station in Putnam County, with Chappaqua its first scheduled stop. At the controls was Stephen Smalls, a 32-year-old resident of Orange County, a three-year Metro-North employee. He had been an engineer for nine months.

The part of the parkway in Valhalla remained closed. One detour available to northbound traffic involved using Lakeview Avenue and turning at the large Kensico Cemetery, a short distance to the west. Lakeview Avenue crossed the two tracks using a grade crossing. The next such crossing was Commerce Street, a lightly traveled local road to the north that intersects the tracks diagonally. It continues northwest through the cemetery for a quarter-mile, then turns north again down a slight rise back over another grade crossing, just north of a brick electrical substation, to a signal-controlled intersection with the parkway. After a crash at the Commerce Street crossing in 1984 that had killed the driver of the van involved, boom barriers had been installed.

Accident

The parkway was still closed after 6 p.m., when a 2011 Mercedes-Benz ML350 SUV driven by Ellen Schaeffer Brody, 49, of Edgemont, went north on Commerce back towards the parkway. Brody had left a Chappaqua jewelry store, where she worked part-time in sales, at 6; she was going to meet a potential bookkeeping client at a coffee shop in Scarsdale. Unable to continue south on the Taconic at Lakeview, she turned west, then north up Commerce Street, towards the intersection she had previously passed. The National Transportation Safety Board (NTSB) later theorized she was hoping the accident had been cleared enough to allow her to return to the southbound Taconic.

Cell phone records show that Brody's husband, Alan, called and spoke to her for almost nine minutes at 6:11, during which time she was apparently still on the Taconic. He told investigators later that during the call he gave her directions to the Scarsdale meeting; other than complaining about a cable bill they both felt was too high, there was nothing out of the ordinary about the conversation. It could not be determined if she had the phone on speaker, which would have allowed her to keep both hands on the wheel, but according to Alan, the ML350 was equipped with software that automatically detected the phone if it was in the vehicle and put it on speaker. Alan, who had once worked as a conductor in his native South Africa, did not believe she was familiar with the area through which she was driving, or that she was familiar with grade crossings.

The call was dropped at 6:19; Alan was not sure if it was because his phone or his wife's had lost power. Shortly afterwards she apparently reached the site of the road accident at the Lakeview intersection and took the detour for reasons unknown. Behind her was a vehicle driven by Rick Hope of Yorktown Heights, returning home from his job in White Plains. He told the investigators that traffic was stop-and-go on Lakeview and Commerce. Both Hope and Brody had stopped for a few seconds at the grade crossing.

At the grade crossing, Train 659 was approaching on the western track. The crossing gates descended, warning lights began flashing and, according to Hope, bells began ringing. Hope says Brody's SUV was in front of the gate as it descended, but not on the tracks.

The crossing gate struck the top of Brody's SUV before sliding down its rear and becoming stuck. Hope backed up to give her room to do the same. He instead saw Brody get out of the car and walk to the rear, apparently trying to free it. "She wasn't in a hurry at all, but she had to have known that a train was coming," he said.

At the head of the train, Smalls told investigators he first noticed something reflecting light from within the crossing when it was  ahead. He soon realized it was from a vehicle fouling the tracks, and immediately hit the air brakes and sounded the horn, earlier than he would have been required to take the latter action if the tracks appeared clear, in the hope that the vehicle would hear it and leave since he knew he could not stop the train in time.

Collision
Brody then returned to her vehicle and, according to Hope, paused briefly. Then the car moved forward, 30 seconds after the gate had come down on her car, investigators determined later.

"There was a terrible crunching sound, and just like that, the car was gone," Hope said. "Disappeared. It happened instantly. There's no way she could have known what hit her."

In the train's front car, Chris Gross was suddenly thrown out of his seat. "I heard a loud bang and a lot of screaming," he recalled. Flames were within a foot (30 cm) of his face; another passenger got the emergency exit open and pulled him out. The five passengers who died were all sitting near him, he claimed. Jamie Wallace, in the second car, said that passengers there initially tried to come to the aid of those in the front car, but "we could not get the head car doors open for some it was jammed." After failed efforts to break the door open, "[a] number of us started smelling fumes from the car, the fuel, and we said, 'You know what, we need to get out.

Due to disruptions in the railroad's electrical system created by the accident, the third rails were not completely de-energized immediately. Damage to a transition jumper isolated the rail on the east of the track, south of the intersection, from its counterpart west of the track and north of the intersection. While the former lost power within eight seconds of the collision, circuit breakers that had detected the loss in power to the former restored it to the last four cars of the train, which remained in contact with that rail, until a manual override was sent a minute and a half afterwards.

Fire

The third rail sections lifted up and punctured the floor of the first car, with the first short segment remaining on the floor while later ones, with one exception that came through a different hole, accumulated atop the seats in the center of the compartment. A final one went up into the roof and punctured the second car at that point as well.

"As the train went on you just heard more of the metal against metal. And all the seats seemed to be like collapsing", one passenger in the lead car recalled in an NTSB interview. Another said that moments after being thrown into the next seat by the impact, he saw a section of rail go through the seat he had just been in.

Passengers in the first car reported small fires breaking out right after the crash, which investigators determined later were fueled by a combination of flaming debris of the third-rail cover, materials from Brody's ML350 and interior components of the train car. While none of the third rail components showed any sign of electrical arcing, there was some localized burn damage on some segments.

Rescue efforts
Smalls went back into the burning train several times to rescue passengers. "He did everything he could," said Anthony Bottalico, head of Association of Commuter Rail Employees, the labor union which represents Metro-North workers. The New York Daily News reported that physical trauma from the third-rail segments was responsible for most of the deaths on the train; later it was reported that four of the individuals who died did so, like Brody, of blunt force trauma.

Passengers further back in the train heard explosions. "The thing that precipitated people really starting to freak out and break the glass and open the door was there was a loud 'bam,' explosion-type thing," said Fred Buonocore, who was in the fourth car. "And once we jumped off the side, there was another explosion to a lesser degree." At the very rear, passengers said they felt only a small jolt. "It felt not even like a short stop, and then the train just completely stopped," said Neil Rader, who was sitting in the middle-back of the train.

The Valhalla volunteer fire department and ambulance corps responded; injured passengers were taken to nearby Westchester Medical Center (WMC). By the time the firefighters reached the scene, they said later, the first car was almost fully engulfed and thus there was little they could do to help evacuate it; most of the passengers had already managed to do so on their own by either going out the front door or removing the windows, primarily with tools provided but in some instances forcibly. The firefighters were, however, able to suppress the fire before it had seriously affected the second car. To facilitate triage and busing evacuated passengers from the scene, the Taconic was closed in both directions at the intersection.

Victims 
Brody and five passengers aboard the train were killed. All but one of the victims were Westchester residents. All of the dead train passengers worked in Manhattan; three of them worked in finance, and two of them at the same firm.

The victims were:
 Ellen Schaeffer Brody, 49, of Edgemont, driver of the SUV, and a bookkeeper and sales associate at a Chappaqua jewelry store
 Robert Dirks, 36, of Chappaqua, a computational chemist at D.E. Shaw Research in Manhattan
 Walter Liedtke, 69, of Bedford Hills, curator of European art at the Metropolitan Museum of Art and author of a two-volume guide to the Dutch paintings in the museum's collection
 Joseph Nadol, 42, of Ossining, an aerospace and defense equity analyst at JPMorgan Chase
 Aditya Tomar, 41, of Danbury, Connecticut, vice president for technology supporting the JP Morgan Chase asset management team
 Eric Vandercar, 53, of Bedford Hills, senior managing director of international sales and trading at the New York office of Mesirow Financial

All the deaths save one of the train passengers were attributed to blunt force trauma; that exception was due to burns and other injuries making it difficult to determine the cause. None of the passengers had soot in their airways. Nine surviving passengers were taken to WMC, with one in very serious condition. There were a total of six deaths and fifteen injuries.

At that point in 2015, it was the deadliest passenger train crash in the United States since the 2009 Washington Metro train collision, which killed nine people and injured 80 others. It is also the deadliest crash in Metro-North's history and was the second Metro-North train incident to result in passenger fatalities, after the derailment 14 months earlier on the railroad's Hudson Line near Spuyten Duyvil that killed four.

Aftermath

The lead car caught fire and was eventually destroyed. Damage was estimated at $3.7 million. Uninjured passengers, who had either escaped or had been evacuated, were taken to a nearby climbing gym called The Cliffs, where they were able to stay warm until buses arrived.A police helicopter with thermal imaging equipment scanned the nearby Kensico Cemetery in search of survivors who might have wandered away from the scene and collapsed into the snow, but found none. 

As a result of the crash, Harlem Line service was suspended between Pleasantville and North White Plains. On the afternoon of February 4, the day after the incident, the NTSB gave permission for Metro-North crews to clear the site. A crew of a hundred cleared the vehicles, using a high-rail crane to remove the SUV. The train was towed to Metro-North's North White Plains yard after 6 p.m., and workers proceeded to repair the damaged third rail. Metro-North service resumed the next morning, with delays of 15 minutes for trains to slow down at the accident site. Commerce Street reopened to car traffic on the afternoon of February 5.

Social and cultural commentary

The accident drew some commentary on what it said about the nature of suburban life in central Westchester County, where many communities owe not only their original development but their continuing affluence to the commuter rail service of Metro-North and its predecessors. In Chappaqua, where the train was to make its first stop, the effect was pronounced, as three of the victims had connections to the hamlet. Dirks lived there, Brody worked there and Nadol was a member of a local Episcopal church.

While early fears that the fatalities would mostly be from Chappaqua were unfounded, as most commuters from the hamlet ride in the rear cars for the shorter walk to the parking lot once the train does stop, residents nonetheless felt anxious, knowing they, too, would eventually have to take the train again. One local shopkeeper, a 30-year resident, told The New York Times that she would never ride the front car of any train, ever. "I remember hoping and praying it wasn't anyone I knew. But ... you don't want it to be anyone anybody knows."

"[T]he exposure goes well beyond simply knowing people on the train," said a psychiatrist at a nearby hospital. "Many of these communities only exist because people are able to travel into the city for work and fun and to see family," said The Rev. Gwyneth MacKenzie Murphy, the interim pastor at Nadol's Church of St. Mary the Virgin. "So this has hit us at a place that is just integral to our existence, and therefore in a place where we are very, very vulnerable."

Writing in The New Yorker, Sam Tanenhaus, who by then had been living in nearby Tarrytown for over 25 years, saw the accident as highlighting "the paradox of Westchester". Parkways such as the Taconic, and winding roads like Commerce, once represented the county's rural charm, the possibility of living in the country yet close to the city, but while they were still charming they were now, with the area so heavily developed, "treacherous" with traffic. "[L]ife 'in the country' increasingly replicates the ills of the city left behind."

Tanenhaus saw the car's collision with a commuter train as another indicator of the way in which Westchester had left the contradictions between its past and present unresolved. Not only is Westchester one of the few places in the country where many workers still commute by rail, all the five passengers who had died were men, recalling the mid-20th century when commuters were overwhelmingly male, working in the city while their wives tended the suburban homes. The accident seemed to him almost to be something from the works of writer John Cheever, who lived in nearby Briarcliff Manor and set much of his fiction amid the suburbs, featuring commuters as his characters: "[He] might have conjured the haunting details of the Harlem Line crash: the lead-footed irony of 'Valhalla,' the survivors wandering through the cemetery to safety."

Investigation

On the night of the accident, the National Transportation Safety Board (NTSB) opened an investigation into the accident, and dispatched a go-team to the site. They planned to stay for a week, collecting evidence and interviewing witnesses.

Theories and issues
Investigators said they were particularly interested in one of the crash's unusual aspects. "We do have grade-crossing accidents, and most of the time it's fatal for occupants of the vehicles, and not for train passengers," Robert Sumwalt of the NTSB told The Journal News, Westchester County's main daily newspaper. "We intend to find out what makes this accident different." George Bibel, author of Train Wreck: The Forensics of Rail Disasters, agreed that this is uncommon. "Normally you'd expect the train to sweep the car off the tracks," he said. But there were other exceptions to this pattern, such as the 2005 Glendale train crash in southern California, at that time the deadliest in the history of Metrolink, where an SUV abandoned at a grade crossing by a driver who changed his mind about suicide derailed the train that struck it, killing 11.

Another unusual aspect was the configuration of the third rail. Unlike other American commuter-rail agencies that operate trains powered by third rails, which have a contact shoe on top of their third rail, Metro-North trains' contact shoes draw current from the bottom of the third rail during operation. The railroad's under-running third rails are designed in order to prevent ice from building up on top during winter months and reduce the possibility of inadvertent contact with the high-voltage rail; as a consequence, they are much safer than the traditional over-running third rails. To facilitate this, the ends of the third rails adjacent to grade crossings have a slight upturn.

"This has never happened before, and this is a rare configuration of a third rail," U.S. Senator Chuck Schumer said. "Do those two add up to the explanation for this terrible, terrible tragedy? Very possibly." But Steve Ditmeyer, a former Federal Railroad Administration (FRA) official, told the Associated Press it would be impossible to be sure that an under-running shoe lifted the rail without also doing tests to see if the same thing would happen in the more common over-running configuration.

The NTSB team theorized that the fire aboard the train might have been caused by gasoline from the SUV, ignited by a spark from the third rail, which had pierced the car's fuel tank, and the force of impact. However, said Sumwalt, "the big question everyone wants to know is: Why was this vehicle in the crossing?" The NTSB team believed the crossing was functioning properly, but was aware also that the earlier accident on the Taconic had led to more traffic through it. "We want to understand what, if any, effect that detour had in setting up this accident."

Some area residents suggested the crossing itself was the problem. County Executive Rob Astorino, who said his commute takes him through that area, called the intersections and turns "very confusing for drivers". Lance Sexton, a Manhattan resident who commutes to the area to assemble electronic equipment, described using it to The New York Times: "[C]oming down the hill of the cemetery, you have to put the brakes on earlier ... There's a bank there that always collects water, making it even more dangerous." He also said he and his coworkers often complained about how quickly the train came after the gates went down, gates which had been installed after a 1984 crash killed a van driver. "How safe is that crossing—for this to happen again?" that victim's sister asked the newspaper.

While the crossing had undergone upgrades in recent years, including brighter lights and an additional sign warning passing drivers not to stop on the tracks, in 2009 another upgrade, which would have added a sign with flashing lights  up the road west of the tracks was not installed. "It's way too early to be guessing about what could have or couldn't have made a difference," said a spokesman for the New York State Department of Transportation.

The gates had gone down 39 seconds before the train reached the crossing, they said, meaning Brody had spent almost that amount of time inside them. They next focused on whether she was familiar with the road and whether she was using a phone at the time; later her cellphone records showed the call to her husband that had ended six minutes before the accident, during which, he said, she had told him that she was unsure of where she was.

Several weeks after the accident, the design of the ML350's gear shift lever, a small paddle that protrudes from the steering column, rather than the usual large lever between the seats, was suggested as a possible cause of the accident. To put the car in drive, the driver must push the paddle down; pulling it up puts it in reverse. The Brodys had only bought the car two months earlier, Consumer Reports noted, and it was possible Ellen might have still been getting used to this newer method of changing gears, and making the occasional mistake, such as her otherwise apparently inexplicable move into the train's path after Hope had backed up to allow her to do so as well. "If someone isn't familiar with one of these systems, they could do exactly the wrong thing in an emergency," said the magazine's director of auto testing, Jake Fisher, who admitted to having made that mistake more than once.

Reports and conclusions

The NTSB released a preliminary report into the accident on February 23, 2015. Two years after the accident, however, it had still not released its final report. Local officials who awaited any safety recommendations the board was expected to make, including Rep. Nita Lowey, contrasted that with the ten months it took the NTSB to issue its final report on the December 2013 Spuyten Duyvil derailment on Metro-North's Hudson Line, which killed four, and the 16 months it took to issue its report on the 2008 California wreck that had prompted Congress to mandate positive train control. The NTSB did not explain why it was taking so long but said it expected the final report to come out in spring 2017.

In July 2017, the NTSB released its final report, which found the probable cause of the accident to be "the driver of the sport-utility vehicle, for undetermined reasons, moving the vehicle on to the tracks". In addition, the driver stopping within the crossing and leaving the vehicle during the warning period, the third rail penetrating the passenger car, and the post-accident fire were all found to be contributing factors.

Driver's behavior
The original question, why Brody had driven forward into the path of the train and thus made the accident inevitable, could not be answered conclusively due to her death. The NTSB had investigated some of the theories that had been put forth. It found many of them unlikely or insufficient explanations for her action.

Brody appeared to have slept well, according to her husband, in the days leading up to the accident. Her cell phone records showed no sign that she was awake between midnight and 9 a.m. when she usually slept, and her coworkers said she had exhibited no exhaustion at her job. She took medication for her hypothyroidism, which could have left her fatigued if she had missed a dose, but her husband said that did not appear to have happened.

The investigators also considered whether Brody had been able to hear or see the train coming. Using a similar 2011 ML350, they measured the volume of the train horn at the distances where she might have been able to get out of the train's way. From , the horn's volume was measured at 93.5 decibels (dB), 50.5 dB louder than ambient noise level inside the Mercedes, much higher than the 13 dB level above ambient recommended by ISO 7731 for audibility of emergency signals and warnings. The investigators allowed, however, that their tests were done with the car's radio and heater off, which may not have been the case with Brody's car that night.

Whether the train's lights were visible or not was harder to determine. From where Brody was when she was out of her car, on its driver's side, the vehicle itself as well as the nearby substation would have partially obscured the approaching train. Other light sources in the area, from other vehicles (as Hope had speculated), the perimeter of a nearby building and her own car, may also have distracted her as she returned to the ML350.

The report next considered whether Brody might have made a mistake with the shifter, as speculated. While prior to purchasing the used ML350 two months earlier she had driven a Honda with a shifter in the more common position between the front seats, her husband told the NTSB that she had not told him of any problems using the column-mounted shifter, which he had also used when driving her car and found easy to get used to. The investigators consulted with the National Highway Traffic Safety Administration and found neither recalls nor complaints related to the shifter positioning or operation. They noted that the motions required for drive and reverse on the test ML350 were similar to those required for a floor-based shifter, and concluded there was "insufficient evidence" that the column-mounted shifter was a factor in the accident.
While the Mercedes was equipped with a GPS navigation system, Brody's husband was not sure whether she used it. Had she done so, it might have provided additional warning that a grade crossing was nearby. The NTSB noted that the Federal Railroad Administration had been working to update its grade crossing database and provide it to the manufacturers of GPS systems; it expected to have that done by late 2017.

Ultimately, the NTSB theorized that Brody was distracted by the gate that had hit the rear of her car and the possibility that it had been dented. "This focus likely consumed her attention; hindering her ability to detect, perceive, and respond to audible and visual cues that the train was approaching," its report said. "[We] conclude that after the grade crossing activated, the driver's attention was most likely diverted to the crossing gate arm striking her vehicle, and she was unaware of the proximity of the approaching train."

Traffic signal preemption
Beyond Brody, the NTSB found some issues with the infrastructure. The traffic signal preemption circuits for both the grade crossing and the Taconic, meant to extend the green signal for vehicles on Commerce when the crossing is activated, were in good working order but it could not be determined which of the two was taking precedence at the time of the accident since there was no recording device. Investigators did, however, find that the circuits gave precedence to the highway signal when its preemption was on, in violation of the federal Manual of Uniform Traffic Control Devices (MUTCD), which mandates that the grade crossing preemption circuit always has priority in situations where a crossing is in close proximity to a traffic light.

This did not appear to have contributed to the accident, as Smalls had said there was nothing in front of her and she could easily have cleared the tracks had she become aware sooner of the oncoming train. Nevertheless, in May 2015, the state Department of Transportation (NYSDOT) adjusted the preemptions at the scene to give proper precedence to the crossing circuit when activated and extended the green signal for traffic on Commerce from the existing 2–10-second range, to 29 seconds, followed by four seconds of yellow, to allow even long vehicles like tractor trailers to clear the crossing. NYSDOT also directed its regions to ensure that every other such signal in the state was in compliance with the MUTCD requirement.

Design of third rails
The NTSB did not address whether Metro-North's use of under-running third rails had contributed to the severity of the accident. Instead, it found the design of the rails themselves did.

It is extremely rare, the report said, for displaced sections of any rail to puncture and enter a rail vehicle during an accident, as had happened at Valhalla. During his interview with investigators, Metro-North's power director told them he believed the third rails were designed to break up in accidents and fail to the side, away from the train, since they had done so during the 1984 single-fatality accident at that same crossing. But in this case, with only two exceptions, the third rail's 6-foot (2 m) sections had largely remained joined in larger sections averaging  in length, weighing a ton (800 kg) each, as they accumulated in the first and second cars.

In those sections, investigators observed fractures in the splice bars and bolts used to hold the sections together, but not the rail sections themselves. They then obtained the rail's design specifications from the manufacturer and, based on Metro-North's own maintenance diagrams of how those rail sections were to be joined, developed a computer simulation using finite element modeling to determine how the rail might react to loads and stresses similar to those it would likely have experienced during the accident, both horizontally and vertically.

Those simulations showed that the rail's splice bars would have required high deformation levels before breaking when bent in an upwards direction. They did not experience sufficient stress to break until the rail sections had already entered the car. "This accident demonstrated that Metro-North's third rail assembly catastrophically compromised a passenger railcar with fatal consequences," the report concluded. "The third rail entering the lead railcar caused significant damage and increased the number and severity of injuries and fatalities."

The NTSB recommended that not just Metro-North, but all the nation's passenger rail services that use third-rail systems with grade crossings, undertake a risk assessment of those crossings and take corrective measures, such as joining rails in a manner designed to experience controlled failure during a similar accident. It also recommended that the Federal Transit Administration notify all the other railroads and require them to carry out the risk assessment, as well as the correction of any deficiencies identified.

Fire
The NTSB also looked at how the fire had started and whether anything could have been done to prevent it. Surviving passengers said it began with sparks from the rails as they entered the car; debris from the ML350 and the rail cover, a polymer-based material, ignited along with fuel from the SUV's tank that had gotten on the rail. From these sources many small fires developed, merging to the point that when Smalls was able to get out of the cab after the train stopped, he recalled that the center and rear of the car were already significantly ablaze.

Passengers in the center and rear were able to use the emergency exits as intended to escape the car since the rear door was jammed by a section of third rail that had gone through it. The NTSB believed that this had prevented additional deaths and injuries among them. In fact none of the five deaths on the train were a result of the fire; no soot was found in those passengers' airways.

Nevertheless, investigators wanted to know whether any of the car's interior finishes, or the materials introduced into the interior by the collision, might have contributed to the fire. Since the first car was so badly damaged, they collected samples of seat covers, wall panels and light lenses from the second car. Upon installation when the car first came into service in 2000, the seat upholstery materials had met FRA flammability standards as required by regulation, but the testing carried out after the accident showed this to be no longer the case. However, the FRA regulations did not require that the materials be reassessed at any point during their service life.

NTSB member statements
Three of the four members of the NTSB filed individual statements to go with the report. Two, acting chairman Robert Sumwalt and T. Bella Dinh-Zarr, concurred with the report's findings; Sumwalt joined Dinh-Zarr's statement. A week after the report was released, a third member, Earl Weener, filed a dissenting statement.

Concurrences
"I suspect some may have had the expectation that the NTSB would be able to explain with certainty why the driver of the SUV ended up on the tracks that fateful evening," Sumwalt began. But with Brody dead, that was impossible. He offered his own explanation: that she "simply did not realize she was on or near railroad tracks" despite the signs and pavement markings. Those were outweighed, in his opinion, by her unfamiliarity with the neighborhood, the fact that the crossing was unlit beyond the warning lights, and the distraction created by the bumper-to-bumper traffic along the Commerce detour.

To the chairman, the strongest evidence for his theory was the way she had calmly left the ML350 to inspect its rear and remove the barrier that had gotten caught on it. "Someone in a good state of mind, as this driver apparently was, who is aware that they are in close proximity to a railroad crossing, and in imminent danger of being struck by a train going 60 mph, would not act this way", Sumwalt said. He noted that in another grade crossing accident in California shortly after the Vallhalla crash, a driver had turned his pickup truck onto the tracks inadvertently out of confusion created by a nearby intersection. Sumwalt reiterated the report's call for the makers of GPS navigation hardware and software to incorporate the FRA's database of grade crossings into their products so that drivers using them had additional awareness that they were crossing active tracks when they did so.

Dinh-Zarr, in her statement, defended the NTSB's work in investigating the accident and its conclusions. Like Sumwalt, she said, Brody's death made it impossible to determine why she drove onto the tracks. So the board thus concluded that had caused the accident after examining every other possible cause and ruling them out when they found regulatory compliance and no deficiencies. The report's recommendations, she concluded, "will aid in preventing this type of tragic accident in the future."

Dissent
The dissenting member, Weener, dismissed speculation as to Brody's motives. "It is human nature to put oneself in the place of another, trying to interpret or judge whether actions are reasonable given all the circumstances," he wrote. "However, speculation does not serve those affected by this accident or further the investigation."

Weener agreed that the evidence suggested Brody had "likely lost situational awareness" between when she saw the marking signs and when she reached the tracks. But he pointed out that among the unknowns were whether Brody knew the impact to her car was from the descending barrier—she could have just as easily thought it could have been Hope's vehicle, he observed, and gone out to check—and whether she had adequate time and space to back up into the space Hope created. She may well have known she was near the tracks and left the ML350 to see where she was in relation to them, since it had blind spots at the front and rear, Weener added.

"It is as important or, perhaps more important, to ask how the SUV ended up within the crossing gates", Weener also wrote, addressing a number of other issues he felt the board should have considered. Were the federal standards the markings and signs conformed to strong enough? Were drivers adequately educated that the barriers were designed to break if they needed to get out of a crossing in a hurry, or that they should continue forward with greater speed from the crossing in that situation rather than back up, much as they are trained to do when a green light turns yellow as they enter an intersection?

"I am left unsatisfied as to how the configuration of this angled crossing, the signage approaching the crossing, the deterrent effect of existing New York rail crossing statutes, and the New York State driver education regarding rail crossing safety may have affected these events", Weener concluded. "I am concerned that the statement of probable cause does not reflect the real causes of this accident."

Post-accident official responses
Since the accident, the town of Mount Pleasant and the MTA have responded to some of the issues discussed in the NTSB report.

Proposed closure of crossing
While the NTSB investigated and prepared its report, the town conducted a traffic study to determine whether the Commerce Street crossing should be closed, also considering doing the same for the Cleveland Street crossing in downtown Valhalla, just south of the station, reducing the number of grade crossings along the line to two within two miles (3.2 km) from four, the most of any town in the county. It found that the Commerce Street crossing met many of the Federal Highway Administration's criteria for closure: high passenger train volume and speed, low road traffic volume, multiple tracks, a mere  to a traffic signal, a poor approach angle (62º), poor visibility due to the substation, and the two fatal accidents in its history. The town deferred taking action or making the study public until the NTSB released its report on the crash, which recommended closing the crossing.

In October 2017 the town made details of the plan public. It would compensate for the loss of westbound traffic at the intersection by changing the timing of the traffic signals on the Taconic, adding a left turn lane at the Lakeview intersection, and restricting truck traffic to local deliveries. A study by the town engineer had estimated that the town could be assessed damages of up to $120 million for the accident despite being able to do little to prevent it, an amount that would have an extreme adverse effect on the town's finances. "My position is, when I'm told that something is dangerous and we haven't done anything about it, what is my liability?" asked town supervisor Carl Fulgenzi. "I'm not putting this town in this kind of liability any further." The $12–15 million cost would largely be borne by NYSDOT, whom the MTA had already petitioned for the closing.

However, residents in the area, particularly those who lived near the crossings, objected vehemently. One woman from Thornwood, a hamlet of Mount Pleasant just north of the accident site, drew applause at a later meeting when she said she had learned how to handle grade crossings during her high school driver's education classes. "[Brody] made a tragic error," she said. "People died, but you can't close crossings that have been working perfectly fine since I've been in this town for 52 years."

Similar objections came from Valhalla residents who would be affected by closing the Cleveland street crossing, noting the lack of any accidents there. Two Valhalla fire commissioners also expressed concern that changes to the local roads would be unable to accommodate large fire trucks. Other residents accused Fulgenzi of being biased in favor of closing Cleveland, since he has advocated doing so for several years, and thus could not keep an "open mind" when evaluating the plan. "I'm only one vote" on the town board, he responded.

MTA grade crossing safety campaign
After the accident, the MTA began promoting grade crossing safety through a multimedia campaign. It added to its website a page developed in conjunction with Operation Lifesaver (OLI), an organization that works to promote rail safety among the public, particularly at grade crossings. Informational posters, reminding passengers to "Wait Behind the Gate" when they drive through grade crossings, went up in trains and at stations on the Metro-North, the LIRR, and the New York City Subway.

The campaign was also spread electronically. Video public service announcements ran on screens in larger stations served by MTA trains, including Grand Central Terminal, Penn Station and Fulton Center. They were also run on Facebook and the websites for many newspapers in the New York metropolitan area. Filmed versions ran before movies. According to the NTSB, the MTA reported success in reaching a population with the OLI material that had rarely, if at all, been exposed to it before.

Enforcement efforts supplemented the education and public outreach. The MTA police worked with local law enforcement to create a Right of Way Task Force. Officers primarily handed out pamphlets to drivers, pedestrians and train passengers at the many grade crossings in the metropolitan area, but also went as far as issuing summonses to violators, even arresting five, by November 2016.

In September 2016, it was announced that the Commerce Street crossing, where the accident occurred, would be one of 43 MTA-operated railroad crossings to get closed-circuit television upgrades, paid for by a $1.9 million grant from the FRA. The CCTV installations, part of a wider project by the MTA to improve safety at railroad crossings, would help the MTA "investigate specific incidents and analyze crossing/traffic operations for targeted modifications to improve safety."

Litigation
Three months after the accident, the MTA had received 34 separate notices of claim, the first step toward filing a lawsuit. Most were from passengers injured or killed, including the Brody family, all alleging negligence. The Brodys' attorney alleged that money allocated for a 2009 improvement that would have brought the crossing to federal standards was never spent. The widow of victim Robert Dirks filed a negligence lawsuit naming the town, county and Metro North, as well as Smalls the engineer as defendants, claiming Smalls could have stopped the train earlier. The lawyers speculated that if he had hit the brake immediately perhaps the collision could have been less severe or avoided entirely. Smalls answered that he had been trained to use the horn first if the tracks were blocked at a crossing, and not immediately use the emergency brake until he was sure of what was blocking the tracks since that could cause a derailment and injure any standing passengers in the train.

Plaintiffs' lawyers were not deterred by the NTSB's finding that Ellen Brody caused the crash by driving onto the tracks as the train approached, a finding that her husband disagreed with, saying the crossing warnings were dated and could have been upgraded.

In 2018 it was disclosed that Smalls had reached a confidential settlement of a legal claim he had made against the MTA; his attorney said the engineer had never returned to work, was no longer employed by Metro-North, and had post-traumatic stress disorder as a result of the crash. Attorneys for the surviving passengers and the families of the dead accused the MTA of "buy[ing] his silence". Around the crash's fourth anniversary, The Journal News reported that lawyers for injured passengers and families of the dead were focusing on the third rail's failure to break up as a contributing cause.

See also

2015 in rail transport
2015 in the United States

Lists
List of American railroad accidents
List of level crossing crashes
List of rail accidents (2010–present)
List of traffic collisions (2000–present)
List of transportation fires

Other transportation accidents with similar elements
1995 Fox River Grove bus–train collision, suburban Chicago school bus struck by commuter train during morning rush hour, killing seven students; crossing was also located near major highway, bus was struck by crossing gate yet distracted substitute driver did not realize vehicle was not clear of tracks, and investigation found no preemption existed for the highway signal.
Langenweddingen level crossing disaster, in 1967 East Germany, fire also started on train by fuel in vehicle after collision resulting from driver's mistaken belief tracks were clear, killing 94 in the deadliest grade crossing accident ever.
2005 Glendale train crash, commuter train struck SUV parked on tracks at grade crossing
2009 Taconic State Parkway crash, also in Mount Pleasant, where counterintuitive behavior of van driver killed eight in her car and vehicle into which she crashed.

Notes

References

Further reading

. General criticism of grade crossing signage by Alan Brody, and suggestions for improvements.

External links

Metro North Accident in Valhalla, NY — NTSB

2015 disasters in the United States
2015 in New York (state)
Railroad crossing accidents in the United States
Train and rapid transit fires
Accidents and incidents involving Metro-North Railroad
Mount Pleasant, New York
Railway accidents in 2015
Railway accidents and incidents in New York (state)
February 2015 events in the United States